Baimaclia may refer to:

Baimaclia, Cantemir, a commune in Cantemir District
Baimaclia, Căuşeni, a commune in Căușeni District